Wayne State Fieldhouse is a multi-purpose arena in Detroit. It serves as the home of the Wayne State Warriors (NCAA Division II) men's and women's basketball teams and the Motor City Cruise of the NBA G League. The arena is owned by Wayne State University.

History
On May 1, 2019, Wayne State University entered into a partnership with the Detroit Pistons to construct a new arena. The $25 million arena would be constructed near the corner of Trumbull and Warren Avenues. There were discussions about bringing the Drive to Detroit, but the Drive's ownership indicated that it preferred to stay in the Grand Rapids area. The Pistons then purchased an existing G League franchise from the Phoenix Suns, the Northern Arizona Suns, and relocated the team to Detroit as the Motor City Cruise in 2021.

Controversy
The partnership between Wayne State and the Pistons was negotiated in secret at the request of the Pistons, contrary to the Open Meeting Laws that govern all publicly elected officials in the state of Michigan (members of the Wayne State Board of Governors are publicly elected in statewide partisan elections). Plans for Wayne State Fieldhouse were announced less than 12 hours before the University Board met to sign the contract. At the meeting, the arena was the first agenda item followed immediately by a university press conference announcing the partnership. There was no time provided for public comment despite the arena's location in a dense residential neighborhood.

References

External links
 Official Site

Sports venues in Detroit
Basketball venues in Michigan